8 Simple Rules (originally 8 Simple Rules... for Dating My Teenage Daughter) is an American sitcom television series originally starring John Ritter and Katey Sagal as middle-class parents Paul and Cate Hennessy, raising their three children. Kaley Cuoco, Amy Davidson, and Martin Spanjers co-starred as their teenage kids: Bridget, Kerry, and Rory Hennessy. The series ran on ABC from September 17, 2002, to April 15, 2005. The first season focused on Paul being left in charge of the children after Cate takes a full-time job as a nurse, with comedic emphasis on his often strict rules concerning his daughters and dating. The series' name and premise were derived from the book 8 Simple Rules for Dating My Teenage Daughter by W. Bruce Cameron.

While 8 Simple Rules was renewed for a second season and production had begun, Ritter's sudden death on September 11, 2003, left the series in an uncertain position. After a hiatus, the series returned and killed off his character. James Garner and David Spade later joined the main cast as Cate's father Jim Egan and her nephew C.J. Barnes. After three seasons, ABC cancelled 8 Simple Rules in May 2005 because of low ratings.

Premise
The rules are:
 Use your hands on my daughter and you'll lose them after.
 You make her cry, I make you cry.
 Safe sex is a myth. Anything you try will be hazardous to your health.
 Bring her home late, there's no next date.
 If you pull into my driveway and honk, you better be dropping off a package because you're sure not picking anything up. (Alternative rule #5: Only delivery men honk. Dates ring the doorbell. Once.)
 No complaining while you're waiting for her. If you're bored, change my oil.
 If your pants hang off your hips, I'll gladly secure them with my staple gun.
 Dates must be in crowded public places. You want romance? Read a book.

Episodes

Characters

Main
 Paul Hennessy, portrayed by John Ritter (2002–2003), was a former sportswriter who worked from home as a lifestyle columnist. He was a protective father whose protectiveness often embarrassed his children and led them to accuse him of hypocrisy. Following Ritter's death, Paul dies offscreen early in the second season. It's mentioned he collapsed in a grocery store while buying milk.
 Cate S. Hennessy (née Egan), portrayed by Katey Sagal, is the wife, mother, nurse, and easily the most sane and composed person in the family. She takes a nursing job at the kids' school so that she can work standard hours and spend more time with the kids. Cate starts dating her kids' high-school principal, Ed Gibb (portrayed by Adam Arkin), towards the end of Season 3. During her teens, she was just as popular, scheming, and rebellious as Bridget, and as such, she is usually the first to notice when Bridget is up to something. Her middle name is Stinky because her father had promised his best friend that he would name one of his children after him after having accidentally stabbed him with a bayonet while they were drunk in Korea; to hide this, she claims that the "S" stands for Stacy.
 Bridget Erin "Beach" Hennessy, portrayed by Kaley Cuoco, is the beautiful, ditzy oldest child. She is depicted as a stereotypical blonde, a popular bombshell who is preoccupied with her looks, teenage boys, and little else. However, she sometimes displays intelligence or profundity in a poignant manner. Her favorite book is J. D. Salinger's The Catcher in the Rye. After her father dies, she begins to steadily mature. Bridget initially feels guilty about Paul's death because the last words that she had ever spoken to him were "I hate you" after arguing with him on the morning of his death. In Season 2, Bridget is revealed to have been conceived on a beach.
 Kerry "Care Bear" Hennessy, portrayed by Amy Davidson, is the disgruntled middle child. She is often seen as unattractive when compared to her beautiful older sister. Bridget accuses her of stealing her boyfriend Kyle, though her own actions had driven Kyle away. Kerry is typically negative and sarcastic, often making snide remarks about others. She is also a passionate activist who cares about animal rights. She loses her virginity to Bruno (her boyfriend in Europe) later in the third season. She is often annoyed at her sister and is easily upset, yet frequently the two girls team up against their parents' authority or at the expense of their brother. Kerry is also very artistic and keeps a sketchbook. She is the smart child, but often shows naiveté. After she starts dating Bridget's popular ex-boyfriend Kyle, her own popularity increases, and she begins to act a bit more like her older sister.
 Rory Joseph Hennessy, portrayed by Martin Spanjers, is Cate and Paul's son and their youngest child. He often takes pleasure in tattling on his sisters. Usually he waits until his sisters have already committed an infraction, then tells his father, who explodes. Rory is his father's favorite child. He becomes involved in money-making schemes with C.J. He is commonly seen playing in the living room and mentions wanting a monkey; he had once acquired a monkey by trading some of his father's baseball cards, and later traded the monkey for a guitar. He also delights in showing his friends the private aspects of his sister Bridget's life, mentioning once that his friends looted Bridget's underwear drawer. Rory is hit hard by Paul's death and punches a hole in his wall out of anger, cutting his hand. He explains the injury as a burn from having removed a hot casserole from the oven. After he enters high school, Rory matures, leaving C.J. to be the main wisecracker of the family.
 Jim Egan, portrayed by James Garner (2003–2005), is Cate's father. Jim served in the Korean War and is proud of his service (he becomes angry whenever the war is called a "police action"). He is very protective of the family. He often sneaks away to smoke tobacco. He is divorced, having formerly resided in Florida before moving into Cate's basement, and often tries to beat C.J. with his cane. He takes pride in C.J.'s success as a teacher.
 C.J. Barnes, portrayed by David Spade (2004–2005), is Cate's nephew. He was once in the army and claims to have studied aerial photography during the Gulf War, and to have received a Purple Heart in combat, which is in contrast to his generally childish attitude. He is a teacher who often pursues women, though unsuccessfully. When C.J. first arrives, the family is initially surprised. He reveals that he was ashamed that he did not live up to Paul's expectations and avoided them because of that. He lives with his grandfather, Jim, in the basement (having previously lived in a van, which Jim had burned). He once dated Mrs. Krupp, Kerry and Bridget's math teacher, but cheated on her with his ex-girlfriend Cheryl. He reveals that his first initial stands for Corey. C.J. previously smoked marijuana heavily (and in fact used to smoke with Kyle's older brother), but he claims to not have touched it in two years (he originally claims it was five years, though he relents after Jim expresses disbelief).

Recurring
 Kyle, portrayed by Billy Aaron Brown, is Bridget's – and later Kerry's – boyfriend. He is often seen spending time with Rory when not with either Kerry or Bridget. His father, Tommy, used to work with Paul.
 Ed Gibb, portrayed by Adam Arkin, is the principal of the local high school. He and Cate knew each other in high school, and even dated. Their accounts of their first romantic encounter are different, each professing to have had more self-control. Despite this, they have some very intimate moments.
 Coach Scott, portrayed by Dan Cortese, is a high-school coach on whom Bridget had a crush. He likes Cate, and Cate initially likes him, but then discovers Bridget's crush, which causes her to deny Scott's romantic advances towards her.
 Jenna Sharpe, portrayed by Nikki Danielle Moore (2003–2005), is the daughter of Paul's boss Nick, and one of Bridget's rivals, who later becomes her friend. She has a younger sister, Rachael (Nicole Mansour), who is a friend of Kerry.
 Missy Kleinfeld, portrayed by Daniella Monet (2003–2004), is Rory's love interest in Season 2. She has a sister, Sissy (Elena Lyons), who likes C.J.
 Jeremy, portrayed by Jonathan Taylor Thomas (2004), is Bridget's tutor and eventual boyfriend. He is considered a nerd at school, and because of this, Bridget at first denies her interest in him.
 Anthony W., portrayed by Cole Williams (2002–2003), is a student in Bridget's class. He is a white boy who speaks like a black rapper, often resulting in confusion. In "Cool Parent",  he is shown to play lacrosse.
 Maggie Barnes (née Egan), portrayed by Cybill Shepherd, is Cate's sister and C.J.'s mother. Maggie shares the same sensitive, moody nature as Kerry. However, it appears (from a conversation between Ed Gibb and Cate) that Cate was the smarter one, as well as being more popular.
 Fred Doyle, portrayed by John Ratzenberger, is a persistent and overly friendly neighbor of the Hennessys, and husband of Mary Ellen (portrayed originally by Shelley Long and then by Cindy Williams). He is the father of Donald "Donny" Doyle, who has dated Bridget for some time. Fred is the head of the neighborhood watch, and his family is religious.
 Mrs. Crupp, portrayed by Suzy Nakamura, is a math teacher at the school.
 Damian, portrayed by Paul Wesley, is Bridget's ex-boyfriend who appears in two episodes.
 Lacey/Lacy, portrayed by Kala Savage (2003–2004), is Bridget's friend who appears in three episodes.
 Laura Egan, portrayed by Suzanne Pleshette, is Cate and Maggie's mother.
Tommy, portrayed by Larry Miller, a co-worker of Paul.

Guest appearances

 Pamela Anderson
 Terry Bradshaw
 Nick Carter
 Dan Cortese
 Mo Gaffney
 Beth Grant
 Josh Henderson
 Matt Lanter
 Thad Luckinbill

 Tatum O'Neal
 Ed O'Neill
 Jason Priestly
 Shawn Pyfrom
 Nicole Richie
 Connie Sawyer
 Connie Stevens
 Raquel Welch

Production

Ritter's death
The first three episodes of the series' second season had been completed when Ritter experienced discomfort during a rehearsal on the afternoon of September 11, 2003. Crew members took him to a nearby hospital, Providence Saint Joseph Medical Center, where he was misdiagnosed as having a heart attack and, as a result, his condition had worsened when physicians later diagnosed him with an aortic dissection. He died that evening at the age of 54. Following Ritter's death, ABC announced that 8 Simple Rules would continue after a hiatus and would incorporate the death of Ritter's character. The three new episodes that Ritter had completed were aired with an introduction by Sagal.

8 Simple Rules returned two months after Ritter's death with a one-hour episode, "Goodbye", which was turned into a tribute to Ritter's character. Subsequent episodes dealt with the family's reaction to his death and how they moved on from it. The first four post-Ritter episodes were shot without a live audience with James Garner and Suzanne Pleshette guest-starring as Cate's strict parents and David Spade guest-starring as Cate's wayward nephew, C.J. Barnes. Garner and Spade later received starring roles in order to fill the void left by Ritter for the remainder of the series' run.

Third season and cancellation
Before Ritter's death, 8 Simple Rules ranked 42nd in the Nielsen ratings. After Ritter's death, it had slipped to 50th, but was renewed for a third season, in which ABC moved the series to Friday at 8:00 p.m. as part of its TGIF comedy line-up. The series' creator and show-runner, Tracy Gamble, left the series for a time over creative differences prior to the third season, but he later returned as a consulting producer midway through the season. Gamble was replaced by Judd Pillot and John Peaslee, who had performed the same role in the final season of Spade's sitcom Just Shoot Me!. The series plunged to 94th in the ratings. Even before the third-season finale's airing, rumors began circulating that 8 Simple Rules was facing cancellation because of Ritter's death and poor ratings. The Friday night "death slot" ratings took their toll on 8 Simple Rules. The third-season finale was not aired for May sweeps. The finale received a 3.9/8 rating share, which gave ABC a third-place finish behind NBC's Dateline (5.8/11) and CBS's Joan of Arcadia (4.9/10), which starred Ritter's son, Jason. ABC officially cancelled 8 Simple Rules in May 2005.

Syndication 
While the ratings for 8 Simple Rules were well above those of the surrounding TGIF shows during the show's third season, ABC canceled it because a perceived inability to sell reruns of the show into syndication; a fourth season would have given the show one hundred episodes, traditionally considered the minimum number of episodes necessary for a show to successfully enter daily syndication.

On July 11, 2005 (less than two months after ABC officially canceled the show), The WB network announced that it would air all 76 episodes of 8 Simple Rules from 4–5 p.m. as part of its replacement of Kids' WB with the Daytime WB block, aimed at a broader audience. The show aired weekdays from January 2, 2006, to September 15, 2006, when it was replaced by Reba upon the merger of UPN and The WB into The CW.

On Tuesday, June 12, 2007, the show joined the ABC Family lineup, airing weekdays from 6:00 to 7:00 p.m. In September 2008, the show began airing from 3:00 to 4:00 p.m., continuing at that time until October 10, 2008. On October 3, 2009, 8 Simple Rules returned to ABC Family, having been absent for a year, airing on Saturdays from 10:00 to 11:00 a.m., and Sundays from 11:00 a.m. to 12:00 p.m. Airings have been sporadic because of the channel's unpredictable movie schedule and holiday programming block. On February 8, 2010, the series was added back to ABC Family's weekday lineup, airing from 6:00 to 7:00 p.m. Eastern Time, replacing The Fresh Prince of Bel-Air. After a few more months of absence, 8 Simple Rules resumed on ABC Family at 7:00 p.m. ET on select weekend mornings, beginning on July 18, 2010. In mid-December 2012, 8 Simple Rules  was removed from ABC Family's weekday lineup, only to be added back in September 2013. The series was removed from the network's lineup once again in 2014.

In the United Kingdom, the show began airing on the Disney Channel in 2003, with the episodes edited for a children's audience. It was picked up by ABC1, which aired it until the channel's closure in 2007. The same year, Channel 5 began airing Season 1 of the series. From 2008, all three seasons of the show were aired on 5*. The series was aired uncut on subsequent channels following its cancellation by Disney Channel. Both Channel 5 and 5* aired the series in its original widescreen format. In 2017, Comedy Central obtained the rights to the show and started airing it on June 12, 2017.

In Denmark, "8 Simple Rules" aired on TV3.

In Canada, the show aired on YTV and ABC Spark (the Canadian version of Freeform).

In the Republic of Ireland, "8 Simple Rules" aired on RTÉ Two. Later, rights to the show were acquired by TG4, which aired the series weeknights at 5:35 p.m. The series was shown on both channels uncut, despite the early time of day, but the show was issued an age rating. On RTÉ Two, it was issued a "PS" rating and, on TG4, a "12" rating.

In Israel, the show aired on satellite provider yes, using its shortened title 8 Simple Rules in Hebrew ("8 כללים פשוטים").

Home media
On August 7, 2007, Walt Disney Studios Home Entertainment released Season 1 of 8 Simple Rules on DVD in Region 1. Season 1 was released in the UK on September 1, 2008.

In August 2008, Lionsgate Home Entertainment announced that it had acquired the rights to the series from ABC Studios. Lionsgate subsequently released Season 2 on DVD in Region 1 on May 19, 2009.

The first 2 seasons of the series were released on Disney+ on May 20, 2022. For reasons unknown, season 3 is absent from the service.

Reception

Critical reception
On review aggregation website Rotten Tomatoes, the first season reports a 57% approval rating, based on 21 reviews. In a review for Variety, Michael Speier deemed the series unoriginal, but did praise the cast performances, especially John Ritter. Critical of the show's humor, he did go on to comment, "nothing even remotely deep here, but “Rules” isn’t as silly as some of its plotlines suggest. Going for the mass appeal, bow’s reach goes a little too far, trying to appease every single potential audience member off the bat with standard-fare jokes about clothing, dating and busy spouses. It would really be something if execs went for the slowburn once in a while, letting some of these shows breathe before jamming punchlines down viewers’ throats."

The second season reports a 60% approval rating on Rotten Tomatoes, based on 5 reviews.

U.S. television ratings

Accolades

References

External links

 
 
 An online (archived) version of Bruce Cameron's article presenting the premise of the 8 Simple Rules
 James Garner Interview on the Charlie Rose Show 
 James Garner interview at Archive of American Television
 Camacho, Melissa. "8 Simple Rules". Common Sense Media. Retrieved October 4, 2012.

 
2002 American television series debuts
2005 American television series endings
2000s American teen sitcoms
2000s American sitcoms
American Broadcasting Company original programming
English-language television shows
Television series about families
Television series about teenagers
Television series about widowhood
Television series by ABC Studios
Television series by Disney–ABC Domestic Television
Television shows set in Detroit
TGIF (TV programming block)